Wijaya Putra School (commonly known as Wijaya Putra or simply WP) is an independent school in Surabaya. This school consists of three schools, they are Junior High School, Senior High School, and Vocational High School. This school was established in 1994.

The high school is well-known for its cheerleading and research club which often participated and becam winners of national competitions.

Extracurricular
Basketball
Futsal
English Conversation Club
Pramuka
Volleyball
Jiu-Jitsu
Modern Dance
Choir
Traditional Dance
Cheerleader
Research Club

References

External links
 

Educational institutions in Surabaya
Educational institutions established in 1994
1994 establishments in Indonesia